George Gerardus "Sjors" van Iwaarden (born 22 February 1969 in Amsterdam) is a Dutch rower. He competed as a member of the Netherlands men's coxless pair teams which finished in 8th place at the 1992 Summer Olympics and 17th place at the 1996 Summer Olympics.

See also 
 Netherlands at the 1992 Summer Olympics#Rowing
 Netherlands at the 1996 Summer Olympics#Rowing

References 
 
 

1969 births
Living people
Dutch male rowers
Olympic rowers of the Netherlands
Rowers at the 1992 Summer Olympics
Rowers at the 1996 Summer Olympics
Rowers from Amsterdam
World Rowing Championships medalists for the Netherlands
20th-century Dutch people
21st-century Dutch people